The Grandmother is an analog semi modular, 32 key synthesizer released by Moog Music Inc. incorporating circuits based on the Moog modular synthesizer Model 15, and the Minimoog.

The Grandmother allows people of any skill level to get involved with analogue synthesis. It requires no patching experience. It features a built-in arpeggiator, sequencer and hardware spring reverb. It also features a reconfigurable front panel, and is controllable via MIDI. There are 41 individual patch points for sound programming, which allows the user the ability to customise their patches even further.

Inputs
There is a 1/4” audio input for guitars, drum machines etc. All modules have 3.5mm Audio and CV inputs for patching.

Sounds
The synthesizer is capable of producing highly complex sounds and modulation. It features sounds such as: basses, kick drums, lead sounds and sound effects.

See also
Moog modular synthesizer
Multimoog
 Micromoog
Moog Rogue
Minimoog
Minimoog Voyager

Notes

External links 
https://www.moogmusic.com/products/semi-modular/grandmother#specs-tab

Moog synthesizers
Monophonic synthesizers
Analog synthesizers